Michael Joseph Keyes, S.M. (February 28, 1876 – August 7, 1959) was an Irish-born American prelate of the Roman Catholic Church who served as bishop of the Diocese of Savannah in Georgia from 1922 to 1935.  He previously served as director of Marist College at the Catholic University of America in Washington, D.C.

Biography

Early life 
Michael Keyes was born on February 28, 1876, in Dingle, County Kerry in Ireland on February 28, 1876.  He attended Christian Brothers schools in Dingle, then became an assistant teacher at one of the schools for three years.  Keyes immigrated to the United States in 1896, teaching for several years at All Hallows College in Salt Lake City, Utah.

While in Utah, Keyes became acquainted with several Marist Brothers priests who motivated him to join the priesthood.  Keyes moved to Washington, D.C. in 1901 to join the Marist Brothers congregation.  He spent the next six years preparing for the priesthood by studying philosophy and theology.

Priesthood 
Keyes was ordained to the priesthood by Bishop Alfred Curtis in Washington for the Marist Brothers on June 21, 1907. After his ordination, he took a position teaching moral theology and canon law at the Marist College of the Catholic University of America.  He eventually became director of the college.  Keyes became an American citizen in 1921. In early 1922, Keyes was appointed as secretary to Cardinal Giovanni Bonzano, the apostolic delegate to the United States

Bishop of Savannah 
On June 27, 1922, Keyes was appointed as the eighth bishop of the Diocese of Savannah by Pope Pius XI. He received his episcopal consecration on October 18, 1922, from Archbishop Michael Curley, with Bishops Denis J. O'Connell and Patrick Joseph Barry serving as co-consecrators.  On July 11, 1934, Keyes asked parishioners in his diocese to sign a pledge from the Legion of Decency to protest "...vile and unwholesome motion pictures."

Keyes's resignation as bishop of Savannah for health reasons was accepted by Pius XI on September 23, 1935; he was named titular tishop of Areopolis on the same date.  After his health improved, Keyes moved back to Washington D.C. to teach moral theology again at Marist College for the next 23 years.

Michael Keyes died in Providence Hospital in Washington, D.C. on August 7, 1959, at age 83.

See also

 Catholic Church hierarchy
 Catholic Church in the United States
 Historical list of the Catholic bishops of the United States
 List of Catholic bishops of the United States
 Lists of patriarchs, archbishops, and bishops

References

External links
Roman Catholic Diocese of Savannah

Episcopal succession

1876 births
1959 deaths
Irish emigrants to the United States (before 1923)
Irish expatriate Catholic bishops
20th-century Roman Catholic bishops in the United States
Roman Catholic bishops of Savannah, Georgia
People from Dingle